Equestria Daily (frequently shortened to EqD or ED) is a fan site dedicated to news and fan fiction coverage of the animated television series My Little Pony: Friendship Is Magic. The site is run with a blog-style interface by a dedicated team of several editors, and has been officially recognized by the show's production team as well as The Hub (later Discovery Family), the American children's television network on which the show airs.

History

Shaun Scotellaro, a 23-year-old Arizona college student, established the website back in January 2011 to collect fan fiction and news specific to My Little Pony: Friendship Is Magic. In order to establish the site, Scotellaro had to cut back on his community-college classes in order to run the site out of his parents' house in Glendale, Arizona. He has explained that he believed the show needed a unified fan base at the time, as he and many other older males had recently become supporters of the show – known as "bronies" – and an overarching concern was that Hasbro would not be authorizing a second season. Towards the end of 2010, when the fan-following was still in its infancy and confined mostly to the /co/ and /b/ boards of English imageboard 4chan, all pony-related content was banned by a moderator who had enough of the flame war that was being waged between those who enjoyed the show and those who did not. Posting a message containing the word "pony" became a bannable offense, and this was the final stimulus that had prompted Scotellaro to launch Equestria Daily.

After its creation, the blog began to gain attention from the fan community. Though Scotellaro ran it solely himself to start with, more and more fans began sending news and updates to him, and the workload increased. By the end of June 2011, the site's staff had been expanded to include two more blog editors, an 'interviewer/YouTube organizer', and a corps of pre-readers for fan fiction submissions, all drawn from the user base of dedicated blog followers. By this point, the website was garnering around 300,000 additional page views per day, and with the supplementary editors was managing to post a greater number of updates with increased frequency, though still primarily of fan fiction. Equestria Daily has also partially branched into other forms of media dissemination, currently possessing a Facebook page, YouTube account and Twitter account, though all updates are still hosted on the originally-established Blogger site. As of July 2012, the site has boasted over 220 million hits since its creation in January 2011. In an interview with CBC Radio in December 2011, Scotellaro stated that the site was reaching more than 500,000 views per day. The site receives enough pageviews per day that it is able to sustain itself through advertising revenue. The site was designed by Knighty, and the site is maintained by the site's developer Gameleon. The art was contributed by Allyster Black, the site's artist and blog editor.

In 2014, the Library of Congress selected the site to be archived as part of their "Web Cultures Web Archive Collection" by the American Folklife Center. The collection was established for the purpose of "documenting the creation and sharing of emergent cultural traditions on the web". This archive currently covers the website's state from June 2014 to August 2016.

Official response
The My Little Pony: Friendship Is Magic production team at DHX Media Vancouver, as well as the network which broadcasts the show, The Hub, have both acknowledged the existence of the fan community, and have individually sent official material specifically to Equestria Daily. The Hub had a summer advertising campaign for the show based around a parody of Katy Perry's "California Gurls" called "Equestria Girls"; one of the lyrics mentioned "bronies" hanging out with the ponies. An extended promotional version of the song was sent to Scotellaro's blog for "our favorite Pony fans". Hasbro themselves sent a review copy of their interactive iOS storybook "Twilight Sparkle: Teacher for a Day" to Equestria Daily, and several key figures in the production team have done exclusive interviews for the website, including supervising director and current showrunner Jayson Thiessen and My Little Pony: Friendship Is Magic developer and creative director Lauren Faust. In July 2011, The Hub sent Equestria Daily the "There's a Pony For That" commercial which includes references to the site. Gameloft's My Little Pony game features a recurring annual event called "Freedom of the Press" which features a shoutout to EqD by naming the in-game news organization after the site. In May 2022, prior to the release of the My Little Pony: Make Your Mark special on Netflix, Hasbro sent an exclusive clip of the premiere to the site.

References

American entertainment news websites
Internet properties established in 2011
My Little Pony: Friendship Is Magic
My Little Pony fandom